COBS may refer to:
 Consistent Overhead Byte Stuffing
 Adenosylcobinamide-GDP ribazoletransferase (CobS), an enzyme

See also
 Cob (disambiguation)